Gagan Arora is an Indian actor best known for his roles in College Romance (2018-present), Ujda Chaman (2019) and Tabbar (2021).

Personal life
Arora completed his graduation in Delhi. After graduation, he moved to Mumbai to pursue a career in acting.

In February 2022, Arora tied the knot with his longtime girlfriend Muditaa.

Career
Before his acting debut, Arora worked as an assistant director on Amar Kaushik's 2018 film Stree. He made his acting debut with The Viral Fever's College Romance (2018), for which he received praise from critics and the audience. He subsequently starred in The Viral Fever's series Girls Hostel (2018–2021), Basement Company (2020) and 4 Thieves (2020). In 2019, he starred in a short film titled Padh Le Basanti, which is directed by Sangram Naiksatam.

He made his film debut with Ujda Chaman (2019) in a supporting role, which was directed by Abhishek Pathak. The film was about a balding 30-year-old bachelor who is in search of a wife and is given a deadline to find one or remain celibate forever. The film starred Sunny Singh and Maanvi Gagroo.

In 2021, Arora reprised his role of Bagga in College Romance 2. The show was well received by critics and audience. In October 2021, he appeared in Sony LIV's Tabbar, directed by Ajitpal Singh. The show starred Pavan Malhotra, Supriya Pathak, Ranvir Shorey and Kanwaljeet Singh. The show received positive reviews, from critics and audiences.

In 2022, he appeared in Madhuri Dixit starrer Netflix's The Fame Game.

Filmography

Films

Web series

Awards and nominations

References

External links
 

Indian actors
Living people
1993 births